Dongfeng Area is an area and township on center of Chaoyang District, Beijing, China. It borders Jiuxianqiao Subdistrict and Jiangtai Township to the north, Dongba and Pingfang Townships to the east, Liulitun Subdistrict to the south, Maizidian Subdistrict to the west. In the year 2020, its population is 63,236.

History

Administrative Divisions 
In 2021, there are 14 subdivisions under Dongfeng Township, with 10 communities and 4 villages:

See also 
 List of township-level divisions of Beijing

References

Chaoyang District, Beijing
Areas of Beijing